Kenton High School is a public high school in Kenton, Ohio.  It is the only high school in the Kenton City Schools district.  Their mascot are the Wildcats.  They are members of the Western Buckeye League.

Football championships
The Kenton High School football team won the state championship in 2001 and 2002, were the state runner-up in 2003 and 2011, and placed in the "final four" in 2013 and 2014.

References

External links
 School Website
 Western Buckeye League official website

High schools in Hardin County, Ohio
Kenton, Ohio
Public high schools in Ohio